Keshit (also Romanized as Keshīt; also known as Geshīt) is a village in Qaleh Ganj Rural District, in the Central District of Qaleh Ganj County, Kerman Province, Iran. At the 2006 census, its population was 173, in 40 families.

References 

Populated places in Qaleh Ganj County